Medical Education And Family Welfare Division is a Bangladesh government division under the Ministry of Health and Family Welfare responsible for family planning and medical education in Bangladesh. Md. Saiful Hassan Badal is the government secretary in charge of the division.

History
In the 1970s the Ministry of Health and Family Welfare had two divisions but they were combined in 1985 for efficiency. On 16 March 2017, the Government of Bangladesh established the Medical Education And Family Welfare Division and Health Service Division through the bifurcation of the Ministry of Health and Family Welfare.

References

2017 establishments in Bangladesh
Organisations based in Dhaka
Government divisions of Bangladesh